Philo Miner Lonsbury (March 3, 1835February 3, 1922) was a Michigan politician and soldier.

Early life 
Lonsbury was born on March 3, 1835, in Rochester, New York. In 1837, his family moved to Cambridge Township, Michigan.

Personal life 
Lonsbury married Eliza in 1865 and together they had six children.

Military career 
Lonsbury enlisted to the army on August 1, 1862. When he enlisted, he was a Corporal. He enlisted in Company E of the Michigan 17th Infantry Regiment on August 19, 1862. Through his military career, he was promoted to Sergeant. On May 12, 1864, Lonsbury was taken prisoner at the Spotsylvania Court House. He was then transferred to Andersonville, Georgia, and Florence, South Carolina, before he escaped from Confederate imprisonment on February 22, 1865.

Political career 
Lonsbury was a Republican. He was elected to the Michigan House of Representatives on November 6, 1894. He was sworn in on January 2, 1895, and served until 1896.

Death 
Lonsbury died on February 3, 1922, in Seattle, Washington.

References 

1835 births
1922 deaths
Union Army soldiers
American Civil War prisoners of war
Republican Party members of the Michigan House of Representatives
People of Michigan in the American Civil War
19th-century American politicians